Zelia (minor planet designation: 169 Zelia) is a main belt asteroid that was discovered by the brothers Paul Henry and Prosper Henry on September 28, 1876. Credit for this discovery was given to Prosper.  Initial orbital elements for this asteroid were published in 1877 by American astronomer H. A. Howe.

Based upon its spectrum, this body is classified as a rare O-type asteroid in the taxonomic system of Bus & Binzel. Photometric observations of this asteroid during 2009 gave a light curve with a period of 14.537 ± 0.001 hours and a brightness variation of 0.14 ± 0.03 in magnitude.

References

External links
 
 

Background asteroids
Zelia
Zelia
S-type asteroids (Tholen)
Sl-type asteroids (SMASS)
18760928